Poplar Bluff is a medium city in Butler County in Southeast Missouri, United States. It is the county seat of Butler County and is known as "The Gateway to the Ozarks" among other names. The population was 16,225 at the 2020 census. The Poplar Bluff Micropolitan Statistical Area consists of all of Butler County. The city is at the crossroads of U.S. Route 60 and U.S. Route 67.

History 

The French were the first Europeans to assert any territorial rights over the Poplar Bluff area. The French held the area until 1770 when it was ceded by treaty to Spain. Spain held the area until 1802 when it was returned to France. During this time the area of Poplar Bluff, as well as all of Butler County, held almost no European settlements until 1819, when the first white settler family moved into the Poplar Bluff area. It was reported that about 300 Native Americans resided in the area at that time.

The earliest permanent settlements in what is now Butler County occurred in the early 19th century along the Natchitoches Trail, an old Native American Trail west of what is now Poplar Bluff on Ten Mile Creek and Cane Creek. Butler County was organized in 1849 and Poplar Bluff was chosen as the county seat. In 1855 the first courthouse was built and the town grew.

In 1927 a tornado leveled most of the city, especially the original business district along Main and Broadway streets. The tornado killed 98 people, tying it as the seventeenth deadliest tornado in U.S. history.

Several buildings in Poplar Bluff are listed on the National Register of Historic Places, including the Butler County Courthouse, Cynthia-Kinzer Historic District, Alfred W. Greer House, Hargrove Pivot Bridge, Mark Twain School, J. Herbert Moore House, Thomas Moore House, Moore-Dalton House, North Main Street Historic District, John Archibald Phillips House, Poplar Bluff Commercial Historic District, Poplar Bluff Public Library, Rodgers Theatre Building, South Sixth Street Historic District, St. Louis, Iron Mountain and Southern Railroad Depot, St. Louis-San Francisco Railroad Depot, Wheatley Public School, Williams-Gierth House, Williamson-Kennedy School, Wright-Dalton-Bell-Anchor Department Store Building, and Zehe Building.

Geography
Poplar Bluff is located along the Black River.

Poplar Bluff takes its name from a bluff that overlooks the Black River. When first settled, the bluff was covered with tulip poplar trees. The Butler County Courthouse and the offices of the city's Daily American Republic newspaper sit on this site. Poplar Bluff lies along an escarpment separating the foothills of the Ozarks from the Mississippi embayment of Southeast Missouri. The foothills lie to the north and west and the embayment is to the south and east. The surrounding area is commonly known as the "Three Rivers" with many local organizations and businesses using the name. The three rivers—Current River, Black River, and St. Francis River—are 40 miles apart with Poplar Bluff located in the center on the Black River.

Demographics

2010 census
As of the census of 2010, there were 17,023 people, 7,181 households, and 4,154 families residing in the city. The racial makeup of the city was 84.79% White, 9.97% Black or African American, 0.53% Native American, 0.89% Asian, 0.06% Native Hawaiian or Pacific Islander, 0.90% from other races, and 2.84% from two or more races. Hispanic or Latino of any race were 2.21% of the population.

There were 7,181 households, of which 30.5% had children under the age of 18 living with them, 35.1% were married couples living together, 17.6% had a female householder with no husband present, 5.2% had a male householder with no wife present, and 42.2% were non-families. 36.1% of all households were made up of individuals, and 15.4% had someone living alone who was 65 years of age or older. The average household size was 2.28 and the average family size was 2.94.

The median age in the city was 38.4 years. 24.2% of residents were under the age of 18; 9.6% were between the ages of 18 and 24; 23.6% were from 25 to 44; 24.6% were from 45 to 64; and 18.2% were 65 years of age or older. The gender makeup of the city was 45.9% male and 54.1% female.

2000 census
According to the 2000 U.S. Census, there were 16,651 people, 7,077 households, and 4,295 families residing in the city. The population density was 1,438.9 people per square mile (555.7/km). There were 7,871 housing units at an average density of 680.2 per square mile (262.7/km).

The racial makeup of the city was 87.04% Caucasian, 9.71% African American, 0.55% Native American, 0.52% Asian, 0.48% from other races, and 1.71% from two or more races. Hispanic or Latino of any race were 1.35% of the population.

There were 7,870 households, out of which 52.7% were married couples living together, 20.28% had a female householder with no husband present, and 39.3% were non-families. 34.9% of all households were made up of individuals, and 17.0% had someone living alone who was 65 years of age or older. The average household size was 2.27 and the average family size was 2.9.

In the city the population was spread out, with 24.3% under the age of 18, 8.8% from 18 to 24, 25.5% from 25 to 44, 21.5% from 45 to 64, and 19.9% who were 65 years of age or older. The median age was 38.7 years. For every 100 females, there were 83.6 males. For every 100 females age 18 and over, there were 78.5 males.

The median income for a household in the city was $22,068, and the median income for a family was $28,744. The per capita income for the city was $13,996. About 19.3% of families and 24.4% of the population were below the poverty line, including 34.4% of those under age 18 and 17.6% of those age 65 or over.

Climate
Poplar Bluff has a humid subtropical climate (Cfa). Winters are cool with occasional snowfalls while summers are hot and humid. Rain is abundant year round, but especially in spring and fall. On average, 58 days exceed  and 2 exceed . In the winter, an average of 10.6 days fail to exceed freezing, while there are 83 days where lows dip below freezing on average.

Government

Poplar Bluff operates under a council–manager form of government. The city manager appoints heads of various city departments and agencies including Airport Director, Art Museum Director, Black River Coliseum Director, Finance, Personnel, Collections Director, Fire Department Chief, City Planner, Police Chief, and Street Superintendent.

Economy 
The largest US nail manufacturer, Mid-Continent Steel and Wire, is located in Poplar Bluff. It is one of 15 nail companies in the US, and accounted for half of US nail production as of June 2018. At its peak, the Mexican-owned firm employed about five hundred workers in the area, but as of 2018 uncertainty over steel tariffs threatens the plant's future. On April 3, 2019, Mid-Continent Steel and Wire received a steel tariff exemption, allowing them to maintain their workforce and increase production.

Education

Public schools
The Poplar Bluff R-1 School District serves the educational needs of most of the residents of Poplar Bluff and the surrounding area. There are seven elementary schools, one junior high and one senior high school in the school district. During the 2008–2009 school year, there were 4,934 students and 374 certified staff members enrolled in the Poplar Bluff R-1 School District. The school colors are maroon and white and its mascot is the mule. Athletics offered in the school district include boys' and girls' basketball, soccer, track, cross country, and tennis; boys' baseball, golf, football, swimming and wrestling; and girls' softball, volleyball, cheerleading, wrestling and swimming.

Elementary schools
 Poplar Bluff Early Childhood Center
 Poplar Bluff Kindergarten Center
 O'Neal Elementary
 Oak Grove Elementary
 Lake Road Elementary
 Eugene Field Elementary
 Poplar Bluff Middle School

Secondary schools
 Poplar Bluff Junior High School- 7th and 8th grades
 Poplar Bluff Senior High School- 9th thru 12th grades
 Poplar Bluff Technical Career Center

Private schools
 Sacred Heart Catholic School
 Thomas M. Lane Seventh-day Adventist Church School
 Westwood Baptist Academy

Colleges and universities
Three Rivers College is located in Poplar Bluff and provides college courses along with career and technical programs. Three Rivers offers the same freshman and sophomore level classes as many four-year public universities. The school colors are gold and black and its mascot is Rocky Raider. Three Rivers Basketball Coach Gene Bess has been recognized as the NJCAA "all time most winning Junior College coach".

Local News 
The Daily American Republic Newspaper is the local news of record for Poplar Bluff with a daily print edition and online news at www.darnews.com

Library
Poplar Bluff has a lending library, the Poplar Bluff Public Library.

Transportation
Amtrak provides passenger train service out of the Poplar Bluff station.

Bluff Area Transit Service provides Poplar Bluff residents with deviated fixed route public transit service. The service operates 4 routes from 8am to 4pm Monday through Friday.

The city is at the crossroads of U.S. Route 60 and U.S. Route 67.

Notable people
 Linda Bloodworth-Thomason, television producer (Designing Women)
 Christian Boeving, fitness model, bodybuilder and actor
Sean Fister, 1995, 2001 and 2005 World Long Drive Champion, inducted to 3 Hall of Fames 
 Leroy Griffith, burlesque theater owner and film producer
Tyler Hansbrough, NBA basketball player for the Toronto Raptors, Indiana Pacers and the Charlotte Hornets 
 Scott Innes, radio broadcaster and voice actor for Scooby-Doo
 Charles Jaco, CNN reporter
 Billie G. Kanell, Medal of Honor recipient, United States Army
 Tim Lollar, professional baseball pitcher
 Matt Lucas, singer, drummer and songwriter
 Julie McCullough, actress-model (Growing Pains and Playboy Playmate)
 Derland Moore, professional football player
Dr. A.K Roberts, poet
Mikel Rouse, composer

See also

 List of municipalities in Missouri

References

External links

 Old images by Poplar Bluff
 The History of Butler County 1870–1930
 Poplar Bluff Historical Preservation Commission
 The Poplar Bluff R-1 School District
 Poplar Bluff Municipal Airport
 Historic Maps of Poplar Bluff in the Sanborn Maps Collection at the University of Missouri

Cities in Butler County, Missouri
County seats in Missouri
Cities in Missouri